Jeff Giesea is an American entrepreneur who is a business affiliate of several of Peter Thiel's companies and venture capital groups.

Education and business
Giesea attended Stanford University, where he edited Thiel's libertarian student paper The Stanford Review. Giesea worked for Thiel's first hedge fund, Thiel Capital Management, and Thiel later provided the seed money for Giesea's startup. Between Thiel Capital management and his startup, Giesea worked for Koch Industries' public affairs office.

Giesea founded FierceMarkets, an online B2B media company. He sold the company to Questex Media in 2008 and left the company in 2009. AdAge named him a top innovator the small business category for its 2008 Top Innovators list.

He co-founded BestVendor, a free recommendation site for business apps, in January 2011. It entered open beta in November 2011 and by December had over 4800 users. The business received $600,000 in seed money from Peter Thiel, SV Angel, Lerer Ventures, and Softbank Capital. By December 2011, it had received $3.6 million from seed rounds and Series A funding. In 2013, BestVendor was acquired by Docstoc.

Following the sale of BestVendor, Giesea did a combination of angel investing and executive coaching. He wrote several articles for Harvard Business Review, including a well-known piece among post-exit entrepreneurs, “Dealing with the Emotional Fall-Out of Selling Your Business.”

NATO & National Security Writings 
Giesea has written several papers for NATO, mostly on the topic of information warfare. In early 2015, he published “It’s Time to Embrace Memetic Warfare” in NATO’s peer-reviewed Strategic Communications Journal. In 2017 he published “Hacking Hearts and Minds,” about the need to allocate more resources to countering foreign information warfare. He spoke at NATO's Stratcom event in Riga that year as well. In 2019 he wrote “Alliance Cohesion in the Age of Populism,” which aimed at helping NATO adapt to the rise of populism while strengthening its original mission. In 2021, he published an article in American Affairs on "The Terrain of Discourse."

Trump affiliations

He has collaborated with Trump-affiliated propagandist Mike Cernovich and fellow Thiel associate and former Breitbart writer Charles Johnson.

Giesea organized a dinner prior to the 2016 RNC. Attendees reportedly included Clearview AI's founder Hoan Ton-That, white supremacist Richard Spencer, Cernovich, Johnson, and VDARE founder Peter Brimelow.

Giesea funded the "Gays for Trump" party at the 2016 RNC, which was hosted by Milo Yiannopoulos and attended by anti-Islamic commentator Pamela Geller and far-right Dutch politician Geert Wilders. In October 2016, Giesea again funded an event hosted by Milo, this time one in which the provocateur bathed himself in pig's blood as a pro-Trump performance art piece commemorating victims of undocumented immigrants and Islamic terrorists. Martin Shkreli also presented an art piece at the event, a framed red-and-blue pill. Gavin McInnes presented an image of himself as an antebellum slave.

Reflecting on his past work for Trump, Giesea wrote in a 2022 blog post that, "By the 2020 election, I had lost passion for Trump and didn’t participate".

#Rev18 

Giesea formed a Super PAC called #Rev18 alongside Mike Cernovich and Jack Posobiec in October 2017 that supported Josh Mandel, then Ohio Treasurer in his campaign for a seat in the United States Senate in the 2018 midterm elections, opposing incumbent senator Sherrod Brown. Giesea described the PAC's goal as to promote anti-establishment candidates "who support American sovereignty and prosperity and who put the American citizen first". All three were on the board, while Giesea handled filing with the Federal Election Commission. Giesea said he was the first donor to the PAC, pledging $50,000. Giesea expressed hope that Peter Thiel and the Mercers would pitch in, among others. Mandel expressed appreciation for members of the Super PAC. The three announced the closing of #Rev18 in late November, explaining that they did not have enough time to devote to it. The Atlantic noted that this Super PAC was among the first examples of Trump supporters—a mostly online, Trump-centric group—venturing into electoral politics outside of support for Trump himself. Right Wing Watch described the effort as among the first to institutionalize Trump's movement.

Personal life

Family
Giesea's mother is Mexican-American. He was having a child by surrogate as of January 2017.

Views
Giesea in 2017 said that he used to be libertarian-leaning, but that he had shifted his focus to the concerns of Middle America. He noted that his experience as a homosexual and traveling in Europe led him to concerns about what he viewed as Islamic incursions in the west. At the time, he saw himself as a mentor and moderator within the Trumpist movement.

References 

LGBT conservatism in the United States
Stanford University alumni
American critics of Islam
Living people
Year of birth missing (living people)